Pleasant Hill is an unincorporated community in Dallas County, Alabama.

History
The community began as a trading post called Fort Rascal prior to the Indian removal.  It gained a post office in 1828 and the name was changed to Pleasant Hill.  The community was visited by Philip Henry Gosse, an English naturalist, for an eight-month period in 1838 when he taught school for Reuben Saffold, a planter who owned Belvoir and ajustice of the Supreme Court of Alabama.  His studies and drawings of the flora and fauna of the area and his recollections of slavery were later published in his book Letters from Alabama.  Pleasant Hill has one site included on the National Register of Historic Places, the Pleasant Hill Presbyterian Church.  It has several sites listed on the Alabama Register of Landmarks and Heritage and one nearby, Belvoir.

Demographics

Pleasant Hill was listed on the 1880 U.S. Census as having a population of 193.

Notable people
Sidney Johnston Catts, 22nd Governor of Florida
Johnnie Cowan, infielder in Negro league baseball

References

Unincorporated communities in Alabama
Unincorporated communities in Dallas County, Alabama